The 2007–08 Slovenian Basketball League (official: 2007–08 UPC League) was the 17th season of the Premier A Slovenian Basketball League, the highest professional basketball league in Slovenia. Union Olimpija won its 14th national championship.

Teams for the 2007–08 season

Regular season

P=Matches played, W=Matches won, L=Matches lost, F=Points for, A=Points against, Pts=Points

Champions standings

P=Matches played, W=Matches won, L=Matches lost, F=Points for, A=Points against, Pts=Points

Relegation league

P=Matches played, W=Matches won, L=Matches lost, F=Points for, A=Points against, Pts=Points

Playoffs

Relegation Playoffs

P=Matches played, W=Matches won, L=Matches lost, F=Points for, A=Points against, Pts=Points

Statistics leaders 

| width=50% valign=top |

Points

|}
|}

| width=50% valign=top |

Assists

|}
|}

External links
Official Basketball Federation of Slovenia website 

Slovenian Basketball League seasons
Slovenia
1